Alisher Navoiy is a station of the Tashkent Metro on Oʻzbekiston Line. The station was opened on 8 December 1984 as the western terminus of the inaugural section of the line, between Alisher Navoiy and Toshkent. On 6 November 1989 the line was extended to Chorsu. It is named after Alisher Navoiy.
The station column type with underground and ground-based lobby. Transfer to the station Paxtakor of Chilonzor Line is available.

Gallery

References

Tashkent Metro stations
Railway stations opened in 1984